Xiangji Temple is a Buddhist temple located in Chang'an District of Xi'an, Shaanxi. The temple is regarded as the cradle of Pure Land Buddhism.

Name
The name of the temple is cited from the Vimalakirti Sutra.

History

Tang dynasty
In 681, during the reign of Emperor Gaozong of Tang dynasty (618–907), master Shandao, the founder of Pure Land Buddhism, died. To commemorate Shandao, his disciple Huaiyun established the temple, which became the first temple of Pure Land Buddhism.  At that time, the emperor gave thousands of Sariras to the temple. When the poet Wang Wei visited the temple, he wrote a poem Visiting Xiangji Temple to eulogize the beautiful scenery. Xiangji Temple was badly damaged in the An Lushan Rebellion. In 840, when Taoist believer Emperor Wuzong ascended the throne, he presided over the destruction of tens of thousands of temples, and confiscate temple lands and force monks to return to secular life. Xiangji Temple was devastated in the Great Anti-Buddhist Persecution.

Song dynasty
In the Song dynasty (960–1279), Pure Land Buddhism continued to prevail in China.
In 978, in the 3rd year of Taiping Xingguo period of the Northern Song dynasty (960–1127), the temple was renamed "Kaili Temple". But it restored the original name soon.

Ming dynasty
Xiangji Temple was renovated and refurbished in the Jiajing era of the Ming dynasty (1368–1644).

Qing dynasty
In 1768, in the 32rd year of Qianlong period of the Qing dynasty (1644–1911), monks repaired the temple. In the Tongzhi period (1862–1874), the temple was completely destroyed in the Taiping Rebellion.

People's Republic of China
1956, it was listed among the first batch of provincial level key cultural heritage by the Shaanxi Provincial Government.

After the 3rd Plenary Session of the 11th Central Committee of the Chinese Communist Party, With the support of the Chinese government, local authorities began to reconstruct the temple.

It has been designated as a National Key Buddhist Temple in Han Chinese Area by the State Council of China in 1984.

On June 25, 2001, it was classified as a "Major National Historical and Cultural Sites" by the State Council of China.

Architecture
The temple complex is located in the north and faces the south. Along the central axis of the temple stand five buildings including the Paifang , Shanmen, Four Heavenly Kings Hall, Mahavira Hall, Dharma Hall.

Shanmen
Under the eaves is a plaque with the Chinese characters "Xiangji Temple" written by the former Venerable Master of the Buddhist Association of China Zhao Puchu.

Mahavira Hall
The Mahavira Hall is the main hall in the temple. The statue of Maitreya is enshrined in the center. On both sides of the hall there are two stone lamps.

Dharma Hall
In the middle of the hall placed the statue of Sakyamuni, with Ananda and Kassapa Buddha on the left and right sides.

Pagoda of Shandao

The pagoda was built in 681 during the early Tang dynasty (618–907). The  pagoda has the brick structure with eleven stories and four sides. Curved bars and cornices are set on each story, which are magnificent and become the symbol of Xiangji Temple.

Cultural relics
The Tang dynasty (618–907) reliefs of Four Heavenly Kings was lost to the United States in 1920 and is now in the Museum of Fine Arts, Boston.

References

Bibliography
 
 
 

Buddhist temples in Xi'an
Buildings and structures in Xi'an
Tourist attractions in Xi'an
20th-century establishments in China
20th-century Buddhist temples